"Do You Sleep?" is a song by Lisa Loeb and Nine Stories. It was released on September 4, 1995, as the third single from their debut album, Tails. It reached number 18 on the US Billboard Hot 100 and number eight on Canada's RPM Top Singles chart, becoming their last top-20 hit in both countries, although Loeb would earn another top-20 single as a solo artist with "I Do" two years later. Outside North America, "Do You Sleep?" reached the top 50 in Australia, Iceland, and the United Kingdom.

Track listings

US CD, 7-inch, and cassette single
 "Do You Sleep?" – 3:50
 "When All the Stars Were Falling" – 2:52

UK CD single
 "Do You Sleep?" (LP version)
 "Birds"
 "When All the Stars Were Falling" (LP version)
 "Hurricane" ("Purple" acoustic cassette version)

UK 7-inch picture disc and cassette single, Australian CD single
 "Do You Sleep?" (LP version) – 3:57
 "Birds" – 2:50
 "When All the Stars Were Falling" (LP version) – 2:53

Japanese CD single
 "Do You Sleep?" (LP version)
 "Birds"

Charts

Weekly charts

Year-end charts

Release history

References

1995 songs
1995 singles
Geffen Records singles
Lisa Loeb songs
Songs written by Lisa Loeb